Verónica García Reyes (born 23 August 1977) is a Mexican politician affiliated with the PRD. As of 2013 she served as Deputy of the LXII Legislature of the Mexican Congress representing Michoacán.

References

1977 births
Living people
Politicians from Michoacán
Women members of the Chamber of Deputies (Mexico)
Party of the Democratic Revolution politicians
People from Zacapu
21st-century Mexican politicians
21st-century Mexican women politicians
Deputies of the LXII Legislature of Mexico
Members of the Chamber of Deputies (Mexico) for Michoacán